Piet van den Bergh (30 November 1865 – 29 April 1950) was a Dutch painter. His work was part of the painting event in the art competition at the 1928 Summer Olympics.

References

1865 births
1950 deaths
20th-century Dutch painters
Dutch male painters
Olympic competitors in art competitions
Artists from The Hague
20th-century Dutch male artists